O 11 was a  patrol submarines of the Royal Netherlands Navy. The ship was built by Fijenoord shipyard in Rotterdam.

Service history
The submarine was ordered on 30 August 1921 and laid down in Rotterdam at the shipyard of Fijenoord on 24 December 1922. The launch took place on 19 March 1925.
On 18 January 1926 the ship was commissioned in the Dutch navy.

In 1927 O 11, Z 7 and Z 8 made a visit to Norway.

She sailed for the Baltic Sea again in 1936 with her sisters O 9, O 10, the coastal defence ship Hertog Hendrik and Z 5. In 1939 O 11 together with her sisters O 9 and O 10 where attached to the coastal division. They acted as the offensive part of Dutch coastal defense.

On 6 March 1940 the ship was accidentally rammed by the tugboat BV 3 in Den Helder. In the collision three men of O 11 died. The boat was raised and its repair was ordered. While under repair Germany invaded the Netherlands and the boat was scuttled to prevent her capture. The Germans raised the boat and ordered its repair. However it was not repaired in time to help the war effort.

While still under repair the boat was scuttled again in order to block the entrance of Den Helder harbor. On 10 December 1947 the wreck was raised and sold for scrapping.

References

External links
Description of ship

1925 ships
Ships built in Schiedam
World War II submarines of the Netherlands
O 9-class submarines
Submarines sunk in collisions
Maritime incidents in March 1940
Maritime incidents in May 1940
Submarines built by Maatschappij voor Scheeps- en Werktuigbouw Fijenoord